Black River Falls is the second album from Cathal Coughlan. It was released in October 2000 on Cooking Vinyl Records (COOKCD 126).

Track listing 
 "The Ghost of Limehouse Cut" (3:24)
 "Officer Material" (4:36)
 "The Bacon Singer" (3:32)
 "Black River Falls" (4:38)
 "Payday" (3:32)
 "Dark Parlour" (5:21)
 "Out Among the Ruins" (4:53)
 "God Bless Mr X" (3:36)
 "Frankfurt Cowboy Yodel" (4:34)
 "N.C." (5:05)
 "Whitechapel Mound" (4:24)
 "Cast Me Out in My Hometown" (4:06)

Personnel

Artists
Cathal Coughlan - vocals, piano, guitars, organ, vibes
Nick Bagnall - guitars
Dave Gregory - guitars
Joe Gore - guitars
Aindrias O Gruama - electric guitar
Dawn Kenny - vocals
Daniel Manners - double bass
Tim Bradshaw - harmonica
Renaud Pion - bass clarinet, bass flute, clarinet, Turkish clarinet
Nicholas Tiompan Allum - drums, wind
Rob Allum - percussion

Producers
Tracks 2-12 produced by Cathal Coughlan, Mark Rutherford and Philipp Erb
Track 1 produced Cathal Coughlan and Nick Bagnall

References

2000 albums
Cathal Coughlan
Cooking Vinyl albums